Gregory Fulginiti (born February 13, 1951 in Cape May Court House section of Middle Township, New Jersey) is an American recording and mastering engineer.

Fulginiti grew up in Wildwood, New Jersey and graduated from Wildwood High School in 1969.

Fulginiti was nominated for the TEC Awards by Mix magazine 6 times, in 1985 and consecutively on the years 1987–1991. Records he mastered earned 175 Gold and Platinum Awards, 25 Multi-Platinum Awards, 100 Number One recordings, 135 Grammy nominees, including the 1990 "Best Album of the Year" winner-Bonnie Raitt's Nick of Time, 7 "Best Picture" nominees for the Academy Awards, 5 "Best Motion Picture" nominees for the Golden Globes, 15 LPs on the Rolling Stone Top 500 Albums, 33 Artists on VH1's 100 Greatest Artists, 12 songs on VH1's 100 Greatest Songs of the 80's and 12 songs on VH1's 100 Greatest One Hit Wonders of the 80s.

References

1951 births
Living people
People from Middle Township, New Jersey
People from North Wildwood, New Jersey
American audio engineers
Mastering engineers
Engineers from New Jersey